Rompers may refer to:
 Rompers (arcade game), a Japan-only 1989 arcade game by Namco
 Romper suit, an article of clothing